Caloptilia oenopella is a moth of the family Gracillariidae. It is known from New South Wales and Queensland, Australia.

The larvae feed on Litsea leefeana and Tetranthera ferruginea. They probably mine the leaves of their host plant.

References

oenopella
Moths of Australia
Moths described in 1880